Kenneth Hampden Pridie (8 March 1906 – 4 May 1963) was an English track and field athlete who competed in the 1930 British Empire Games and in the 1934 British Empire Games. He was born in Bristol.

At the 1930 British Empire Games he finished fourth in the discus throw event and sixth in the shot put competition.

Four years later he won the bronze medal in the shot put contest and finished sixth in the discus throw event at the 1934 British Empire Games.

Pridie was an orthopaedic surgeon. He studied at the University of Bristol. With a Fellowship from the Royal College of Surgeons of England he visited Böhler in Vienna, Watson-Jones in Liverpool and Girdlestone in Oxford. Twenty-eight years old he became a fracture surgeon at Bristol Royal Infirmary. He developed several devices for fracture treatment and was an eminent surgeon. Pridie is known for a particular cartilage repair technique where repair by fibrocartilage formation is stimulated by drilling small holes into the subchondral bone plate after surgical debridement of cartilage defects, known as the Pridie drilling technique. He died of a heart attack in 1963.

References

External links
Profile at TOPS in athletics

1906 births
1963 deaths
Sportspeople from Bristol
English male shot putters
British male shot putters
British male discus throwers
English male discus throwers
Commonwealth Games bronze medallists for England
Commonwealth Games medallists in athletics
Athletes (track and field) at the 1930 British Empire Games
Athletes (track and field) at the 1934 British Empire Games
British orthopaedic surgeons
English surgeons
20th-century surgeons
Medallists at the 1934 British Empire Games